Worldways Canada was a Canadian charter airline that started in operations in 1973, ceased its operations on 11 October 1990 and went out of business in 1991.

Operations and fleet
The fleet of aircraft started with Lockheed Electra aircraft and they added the DC4's. The Convair 560 was added to the fleet, replacing the Electra aircraft. The Convair 640's were added and put on charter on the East Coast supporting the oil industry.

When Ontario World Air folded in 1981, Worldways bought 3 of the B707-320 aircraft and entered the international passenger charter markets. In 1983, Worldways sold the B707 to the Australian Air Force and bought the 4 x sister ship DC8-63 from CPAir.

In 1985, Worldways added the 2 x L1011-385-1 (later upgraded to -50) aircraft. These were previously operated by Pacific Southwest Airlines and AeroPerú. These 2 x L1011 aircraft were 2 of the 5 built by Lockheed where the front cargo hold was removed and a lounge complete with air stairs was installed. LTU had the other 3 ships with the forward lounge. Worldways had winter leases with Eastern Airlines and British Caledonian to bring in additional L1011 aircraft for the winter charter season. In 1989, Worldways purchased 3 x B-727-100 from TAP Air Portugal. 
 
The airline was created by Roy T. Moore with the assistance of Dennis Lewis.

In 2019 Worldways the www.worldways.com  brand was acquired and relaunched as a private jet charter company.  The Worldways name was re-launched as the industry 1st live private charter booking engine for private and personal jet travel. Similar to Kayak.com and other portals offering commercial jet travel. Worldways focuses only on private jet travel with instant booking and confirmation. The Worldways booking engine connects the Worldways passenger to over 12,000 Charter Airline carriers.

See also 
 List of defunct airlines of Canada

References

External links

Defunct airlines of Canada
Airlines established in 1973
Airlines disestablished in 1990
1973 establishments in Canada
Canadian companies established in 1973
Canadian companies disestablished in 1990